Unicoi County is a county located in the U.S. state of Tennessee. As of the 2020 census, the population was 17,928. Its county seat is Erwin. Unicoi is a Cherokee word meaning "white," "hazy," "fog-like," or "fog draped," and refers to the mist often seen in the foothills and mountains of this far northeast county. Unicoi County is part of the Johnson City Metropolitan Statistical Area, which is a component of the Johnson City–Kingsport–Bristol, TN-VA Combined Statistical Area, commonly known as the "Tri-Cities" region.

History
This area was long inhabited by indigenous peoples, including the historic Cherokee who encountered European and English traders and settlers. The mountainous terrain made it less attractive to subsistence farmers. 

Unicoi County was created in 1875 from portions of Washington and Carter counties. Its first European-American settlers had arrived more than a century earlier but the population had been small. The county remained predominantly agrarian until the railroads were constructed in the area in the 1880s.

During the 1910s, the Clinchfield Railroad established a pottery in Erwin, which eventually incorporated under the name, "Southern Potteries."  This company produced a popular brand of dishware, commonly called Blue Ridge China, which featured hand-painted underglaze designs. While the company folded in the 1950s, Blue Ridge dishes remain popular with antique collectors.

In 1916, a circus elephant, Mary, was hanged in Erwin for killing her trainer. Hanging was chosen as the method of execution because the animal survived being shot. She was hanged by a railroad car crane.  The hanging was the subject of a book, The Day They Hung the Elephant (1992), by Charles Edwin Price.

Pronunciation

Hear it spoken (Voice of Unicoi County Mayor Greg Lynch, 2010)

Geography

It is the fifth-smallest county in Tennessee by total area. The Nolichucky River, which enters Unicoi County from North Carolina, is the county's primary drainage.

Unicoi County is situated entirely within the Blue Ridge Mountains, specifically the Bald Mountains (south of the Nolichucky) and the Unaka Range (north of the Nolichucky). Traversed by the Appalachian Trail, the mountain is topped by a grassy bald, allowing a 360-degree view of the surrounding mountains.

Adjacent counties
Washington County (north)
Carter County (northeast)
Mitchell County, North Carolina (east)
Yancey County, North Carolina (south)
Madison County, North Carolina (southwest)
Greene County (west)

National protected areas
Appalachian Trail (part)
Cherokee National Forest (part)

State protected areas
Rocky Fork State Park

Major Highways

Demographics

2020 census

As of the 2020 United States census, there were 17,928 people, 7,658 households, and 4,953 families residing in the county.

2000 census
As of the census of 2000, there were 17,667 people, 7,516 households, and 5,223 families residing in the county.  The population density was 95 people per square mile (37/km2).  There were 8,214 housing units at an average density of 44 per square mile (17/km2).  The racial makeup of the county was 97.96% White, 0.07% Black or African American, 0.25% Native American, 0.08% Asian, 0.03% Pacific Islander, 0.95% from other races, and 0.66% from two or more races.  1.94% of the population were Hispanic or Latino of any race.

There were 7,516 households, out of which 26.60% had children under the age of 18 living with them, 56.40% were married couples living together, 9.50% had a female householder with no husband present, and 30.50% were non-families. 27.50% of all households were made up of individuals, and 13.40% had someone living alone who was 65 years of age or older.  The average household size was 2.31 and the average family size was 2.80.

In the county, the population was spread out, with 20.50% under the age of 18, 7.50% from 18 to 24, 27.50% from 25 to 44, 26.50% from 45 to 64, and 18.10% who were 65 years of age or older.  The median age was 42 years. For every 100 females, there were 95.10 males.  For every 100 females age 18 and over, there were 91.60 males.

The median income for a household in the county was $29,863, and the median income for a family was $36,871. Males had a median income of $30,206 versus $20,379 for females. The per capita income for the county was $15,612.  About 8.70% of families and 13.10% of the population were below the poverty line, including 17.70% of those under age 18 and 13.50% of those age 65 or over.

Communities

Towns
Erwin (county seat)
Unicoi

Census-designated place
Banner Hill

Unincorporated communities
Bumpus Cove (partial)
 Clearbranch
Flag Pond
Limestone Cove
 Shallowford

Politics
Voters of Unicoi County, like most of eastern Tennessee, have been strongly affiliated with the Republican Party since before the Civil War, when it was a Unionist enclave. Since its founding, it has supported the Republican presidential candidate in all but one election (1912, when it backed Theodore Roosevelt's Progressive Party campaign).

At the state level, Unicoi County has historically been slightly more receptive to Democratic candidates, generally when they win by landslides. It often supported Democratic candidates for governor in the Solid South era, when white conservatives largely were affiliated as Democrats. More recently, it backed Democrat Ned McWherter in the 1986 and 1990 gubernatorial elections and Phil Bredesen in 2006, when he won every county in the state.

See also
National Register of Historic Places listings in Unicoi County, Tennessee

References

External links

Official website
Unicoi County Chamber of Commerce
Unicoi County Schools
TNGenWeb

 
1875 establishments in Tennessee
Populated places established in 1875
Tennessee placenames of Native American origin
Johnson City metropolitan area, Tennessee
Counties of Appalachia
Second Amendment sanctuaries in Tennessee
East Tennessee